Greatest Hits is a greatest hits album by Australian rock band Spiderbait. The band decided to put out the compilation after discovering newer fans had not been aware of Spiderbait before "Black Betty". "We'd talk to these excited kids who didn't know our previous albums," recalls Kram. "It was like Tonight Alright was our debut album in some ways".

The sequencing of Greatest Hits was done in reverse order, with the new song "On My Way" at the start and "Circle K" from 1991 at the end. The album was released as a single-disc edition and also as a two-disc version. The second disc was a DVD with all of Spiderbait's music videos up to that point (except "On My Way").

Track listing

Bonus DVD

Charts

Weekly charts

Year-end charts

Certifications

Release history

References

Spiderbait albums
2005 greatest hits albums
Compilation albums by Australian artists